Indianapolis Fire Headquarters and Municipal Garage is a historic fire station and garage located at Indianapolis, Indiana. The Fire Headquarters was built in 1913 for the Indianapolis Fire Department, and is a three-story, Classical Revival style orange-brown glazed brick building with limestone detailing. It sits on a concrete foundation and has a square brick parapet. The Classical Revival style Municipal Garage was built in 1913, and expanded in 1925 with two Tudor Revival style additions.

It was listed on the National Register of Historic Places in 2002.

References

Government buildings on the National Register of Historic Places in Indiana
Neoclassical architecture in Indiana
Tudor Revival architecture in Indiana
Government buildings completed in 1913
Buildings and structures in Indianapolis
National Register of Historic Places in Indianapolis